Sankha Ghosh (born Chittapriya Ghosh; 5 February 1932 – 21 April 2021) was an Indian poet and literary critic. He was born in Chandpur District of the then Bengal Presidency, present day Bangladesh. His ancestral home was at Banaripara Upazila in Barisal District. He spent his childhood and adolescence in Ishwardi Upazila of Pabna District, which was his father's workplace.

Ghosh passed matriculation from Chandraprabha Vidyapitha, Pabna. He got his undergraduate degree in Arts in Bengali from Presidency College, Kolkata in 1951 and subsequently his master's degree from the University of Calcutta in the year 1954.

Career 
He retired from Jadavpur University in 1992. In 1967, he participated in the International Writing Program's Fall Residency at the University of Iowa in Iowa City, IA. He also taught at Delhi University, the Indian Institute of Advanced Studies at Shimla, and at the Visva-Bharati University. He won many awards including Jnanpith Award in 2016. His pen name was Kuntak. Among the most respected names in contemporary Bengali literature, Ghosh was one of the ‘Pancha Pandavas’— along with Shakti Chattopadhyay, Sunil Gangopadhyay, Binoy Majumdar and Utpal Kumar Basu — who gave a new identity to the Bengali literary world.

Ghosh tested positive for COVID-19 on 14 April 2021. Later he suffered from several complications and died on 21 April 2021, at his home in Kolkata.

Literary contributions

Shankha Ghosh made an immense contribution to the world of Bengali poetry. ‘Days and Nights’, ‘Babar’s Prayer’, ‘Face Covered in Advertisement’, ‘Gandharva Poems’ are his notable books of poetry.Although Shankha Ghosh was initially known as a 'poet', his prose works are numerous. He has combined poetry and prose. He was an eminent Rabindra expert, noting Rabindranath Tagore's 'Ocampore Rabindranath', 'A Amir Awaran', 'Kaler Matra O Rabindra Natak', 'Chhander Baranda' and 'Damini's Song'. ‘Words and Truth’, ‘Urvashir Hasi’, ‘Ahan Sab Alik’ are his other notable prose works. His writings have been studied and popular in Bengali for years. The poetic mind of Shankha Ghosh, its speed is two-way. 

On the one hand, that mind is always aware of the repercussions of all the socio-political events of the day.Ghosh's sensitive poetry roared against any unjust injustice in the society. We see its expression sometimes in poems written in sharp satire, satirical language. The people of the lower classes, the poor can get the poetry of Shankha Ghosh as a companion to their daily suffering. Shankha Ghosh identifies every inequality of society, every lack of justice with his infallible poems.

Works
Poetics

1.	Dinguli rātaguli (1956)

2.	Ekhan samaẏa naẏ (1967)

3.	Nihita pātālachāẏā (1967)

4.	Saṅkha ghōṣēr śrēṣṭha kabitā (1970)

5.	Adima latāgulmamaẏ (1972)

6.	Mūrkha baṛa sāmājika naẏa (1974)

7.	Baburēr prārthanā (1976)

8.	Minibook[ মিনিবুক] (1978)

9.	Tumi to temon  gaurī na'ō [তুমি তেমন গৌরী নও  ](1978)

10.	Panjarē dāṛēr Shabda [পাঁজরে দাঁড়ের শব্দ ](1980)

11.	Kabitāsangraha -1[ কবিতাসংগ্রহ -১ ] (1980)

12.	Praharajōṛā tritāla [ প্রহরজোড়া ত্রিতাল](1982)

13.	Mukh  ḍhēkē jay Bigyapanē[মুখ ঢেকে যায় বিজ্ঞাপনে ] (1984)

14.	Bandhurā māti tarajāẏa [বন্ধুরা মাতি তরজায়  ](1984)

15. Dhuma lēgēchē hr̥idakamalē  [ধুম লেগেছে হৃদকমলে  ](1984)

16. Kabitāsaṅgraha - 2[ কবিতাসংগ্রহ - ২ ] (1991)

17.Lainei chilāma bābā [ লাইনেই ছিলাম বাবা](1993)

18. Gāndharva kabitāguccha[ গান্ধর্ব কবিতাগুচ্ছ ] (1994)

19.Saṅkha ghōṣēr nirbācita prēmēr kabitā[ শঙ্খ ঘোষের নির্বাচিত প্রেমের কবিতা] (1994)

20. Mini kabitār boi[মিনি কবিতার বই  ] (1994)

21. Saber uparē śāmiẏānā [ শবের উপরে শামিয়ানা](1996)

22.Chhandēr bhitarē ēto andhakār [ ছন্দের ভিতরে এত অন্ধকার](1999)

23. Jol'i pāṣāṇ hoẏē āchē [ জলই পাষাণ হয়ে আছে ](2004)

24. Samasta khatēr mukhē pali [ সমস্ত ক্ষতের মুখে পলি ](2007)

25. Māṭikhōm̐ṛā purōnō karōṭi[ মাটিখোঁড়া পুরোনো করোটি] (2009)

26. Gōṭādēśajōṛā ja'ughara [ গোটাদেশজোড়া জউঘর ](2010)

27. Hāsikhuśi mukhē sarbanāś[ হাসিখুশি মুখে সর্বনাশ] (2011)

28. Prati praśnē jēgē ōṭhē bhiṭē [ প্রতি প্রশ্নে জেগে ওঠে ভিটে](2012)

29.Bahus Various stabdha paṛē āchē[বহুস্বর স্তব্ধ পড়ে আছে  ] (2014)

30.prēmēra kabitā [প্রেমের কবিতা ](2014)

31 . śaṅkha ghōṣēra kabitāsaṅgraha[শঙ্খ ঘোষের কবিতাসংগ্রহ ] (2015)

32. śuni nīraba ciṯkāra[ শুনি নীরব চিৎকার ] (2015)

33. ē'ō ēka byathā upaśama [এও এক ব্যথা উপশম ](2017)

Prose

1. kālēra mātrā ō rabīndranāṭak [  কালের মাত্রা ও রবীন্দ্রনাটকএ](1969)

2. niḥśabdēra tarjanī[ নিঃশব্দের তর্জনী ] (1971)

Awards
 Narsingh Das Puraskar (1977, for Murkha baro, samajik nay)
 Sahitya Akademi Award (1977, for Baabarer praarthanaa)
 Rabindra Puraskar (1989, for Dhum legechhe hrit kamale)
 Saraswati Samman for his anthology Gandharba Kabitaguccha
 Sahitya Akademi Translation Prize for translation of Taledanda (Kannada) Play into Bengali named Raktakalyan (1999)
 Desikottam by Visva-Bharati (1999)
 D.Litt. by Vidyasagar University (2010)
 Padma Bhushan by the Government of India (2011)
 Hall of Fame Lifetime Achievement "Sahityabrahma" Award by the World Forum for Journalists and Writers (WFJW) (2015)
 D.Litt. by Indian Institute of Engineering Science and Technology, Shibpur, India (2015)
Jnanpith Award by the Government of India (2016)

References

External links

Writers from Kolkata
Presidency University, Kolkata alumni
Bengali-language poets
People from Chandpur District
Recipients of the Rabindra Puraskar
Recipients of the Sahitya Akademi Award in Bengali
University of Calcutta alumni
Academic staff of the University of Calcutta
1932 births
2021 deaths
Recipients of the Padma Bhushan in literature & education
Academic staff of Jadavpur University
Academic staff of Visva-Bharati University
Indian literary critics
Academic staff of City College, Kolkata
International Writing Program alumni
Bengali male poets
Bengali Hindus
Recipients of the Jnanpith Award
Recipients of the Gangadhar National Award
Deaths from the COVID-19 pandemic in India
Recipients of the Sahitya Akademi Prize for Translation